A Warm Glimpse is the first studio album released by Finnish progressive death metal band Farmakon.  The album was originally released in 2003, under Earache Records.  The opening track, "Loosely of Ameobas" was included on Earache's "Metal: A Headbanger's Companion II" compilation.

The musical style mixes death metal with funk and jazz, with both clean vocals and death growls, interspersed throughout the songs, and scat singing done in both methods, on "Flavored Numerology".  The style is frequently cited as being similar to the works of Opeth, Mr. Bungle, and Atheist.

Track listing
All music by Farmakon; Lyrics by Lassi Paunonen and Marko Eskola
 "Loosely of Amoebas" – 4:55
 "My Sanctuary in Solitude" – 5:07
 "Mist" – 4:15
 "Stretching Into Me" – 6:14
 "Same" – 3:22
 "Flowgrasp" – 6:40
 "Flavored Numerology" – 4:54
 "Pearl of My Suffering" – 6:49
 "Wallgarden" – 5:18

Credits

Band
 Lassi Paunonen – Guitars
 Toni Salminen − Guitars
 Riku Airisto – Drums
 Marko Eskola − Vocals, Bass

Production
 Produced by Farmakon
 Mixed by Pirkka Rannali
 Mastered by Mika Jussila at Finnvox
 Cover Design by Timo Vuorensola and Eemeli Haverinen
 Photography by Eemeli Haverinen

References

Farmakon albums
2003 debut albums
Earache Records albums